San Bartolomé de Béjar is a municipality located in Castile and León, Spain. According to the 2006 census (INE), the municipality has a population of 53 inhabitants.

References

Municipalities in the Province of Ávila